is a Japanese former long-distance runner who competed in the 1988 Summer Olympics.

References

1961 births
Living people
Japanese male long-distance runners
Olympic athletes of Japan
Athletes (track and field) at the 1988 Summer Olympics
Universiade medalists in athletics (track and field)
Universiade gold medalists for Japan
Medalists at the 1983 Summer Universiade